William Sherwood Houghton (5 January 1890 – 22 March 1952) was an Australian rules footballer who played with University during the 1914 VFL season. Houghton enlisted to serve in World War I in mid 1915 and served until the end of the war.

References

External links 

1890 births
1952 deaths
University Football Club players
Australian military personnel of World War I
Australian rules footballers from Victoria (Australia)